Suno Ke Main Hun Jawan (Urdu: سنو کے میں ہو جوان) was the debut studio album of the Pakistani pop/rock band Noori. The album was released on 25 October 2003 and was a commercial success. Singles from this album were "Suno Ke Main Hu Jawan", "Tum Hans Diyay", "Gana No. 1", "Dil Ki Qasam", "Neend Ayay Na", "Manwa Re" and "Jana Tha Hum Ne".

Track listing
All music composed & arranged by Ali Noor.

Personnel
All information is taken from the CD.

Noori
 Ali Noor: lead vocals, lead guitar, keyboards
 John "Gumby" Louis Pinto: drums
 Ali Hamza: rhythm, vocals
 Muhammad Ali Jafri: bass guitar

Additional musicians
 Guitars and Bass on "Hum Bhoolay": Mekaal Hasan

Production
Produced by Mekaal Hasan, Ali Noor & Muhammad Ali Jaffri
Recorded & Mixed at Digital Fidelity Studios, Lahore, Punjab
Guitar sound engineer: Mekaal Hasan, Muhammad Ali Jafri
Drums engineer: Mekaal Hasan
Assisted by Mekaal Hasan

References

External links
Official Website

2003 debut albums
Noori albums
Urdu-language albums